The foreign relations of Romania are conducted by the Ministry of Foreign Affairs (Ministerul Afacerilor Externe; MAE). Romania is a member of NATO and the European Union.

Diplomatic list 
List of countries which Romania maintains diplomatic relations with (all UN members except Bhutan and Tonga):

Relations by Continent

Europe (Inside the European Union)

Romania joined the European Union (EU) on January 1, 2007. Romania also declared its public support for Turkey and Croatia joining the European Union. Romania shares a privileged economic relation with Turkey.

Europe (Outside of the European Union)

Asia

Africa: Arab Maghreb Union (AMU)

Africa: Economic Community of West African States (ECOWAS)

Africa: Economic Community of Central African States (ECCAS)

Africa: Northwest and Horn of Africa (mostly IGAD)

Africa: East African Community (EAC)

Africa: Southern African Development Community (SADC)

Africa: Indian Ocean's islands

North America and the Caribbean

South and Central America

Oceania

Countries which Romania has no diplomatic relations with

Europe

Caucasus

Asia

Africa

International Organizations 
Romania is a member of the following international organisations:

 Council of Europe
 International Atomic Energy Agency
 International Red Cross and Red Crescent Movement
 International Federation of Red Cross and Red Crescent Societies
 NATO
 United Nations
 International Maritime Organization
 Organization of the Black Sea Economic Cooperation
 Black Sea Trade and Development Bank
 Union for the Mediterranean
 Antarctic Treaty System (without consulting status)
 Asia–Europe Meeting
 European Patent Organisation
 Interpol
 European Space Agency

See also
 List of diplomatic missions in Romania
 List of diplomatic missions of Romania
 List of Romanian diplomats
 Romania's foreign policy in the years preceding the outbreak of the World War I

References